Zaeeropsis is a genus of longhorn beetles of the subfamily Lamiinae, containing the following species:

 Zaeeropsis godeffroyi Breuning, 1943
 Zaeeropsis lepida (Germar, 1848)

References

Pteropliini